Hexastylis shuttleworthii, commonly known as largeflower heartleaf, is a flowering plant in the pipevine family. This plant is a low growing, rhizomatous perennial that produces jug-shaped flowers in early summer. It is native to the Southeastern United States.

There are two named varieties:<ref>{{cite web |url=http://www.efloras.org/florataxon.aspx?flora_id=1&taxon_id=233500671 |title=Hexastylis shuttleworthii |website=Flora of North America}}</ref>Hexastylis shuttleworthii var. harperi - Native to Georgia, Alabama, and northeast Mississippi. Found in bogs and acidic hammocks.Hexastylis shuttleworthii var. shuttleworthii - Native to the southern Appalachians. Found in acidic soil along creeks, often in dark woods underneath Rhododendron maximum''.

References

Aristolochiaceae
Flora of the Southeastern United States
Flora of the Appalachian Mountains
Flora without expected TNC conservation status